Živalevo is a village in the municipality of Kratovo, North Macedonia, located on the Kratovska Reka river.

Demographics
According to the 2002 census, the village had a total of 155 inhabitants, all of which were ethnic Macedonians.

References

Villages in Kratovo Municipality